Babingtonia urbana, commonly known as coastal plain babingtonia, is a shrub endemic to Western Australia.

It is found in a few small areas in Wheatbelt and the outskirts of Perth in Western Australia between Dandaragan and Canning.

References

Eudicots of Western Australia
urbana
Endemic flora of Western Australia
Plants described in 2015
Taxa named by Barbara Lynette Rye
Taxa named by Malcolm Eric Trudgen